Sharlene Taulé Ponciano (born May 11, 1991) better known as Sharlene, is a Dominican singer and actress.

Early life 
Taulé studied singing with María Remola and Nadia Nicola, and performed in New York at the Lee Strasberg Theatre and Film Institute.

Career 
Her filmography includes the films Los locos también piensan, La fiesta del chivo, Viajeros, Yuniol, Tropic of Blood, La Roja, Flucht Aus Santo Domingo and Code 666, which earned her a Soberano Award nomination for Best Actress in a Film. She appeared in the musicals Evita, Les Misérables, Fiddler on the Roof, Hairspray, Cinderella and the theatrical production of The Graduate. Her television credits include the music video for Bendita tu luz by Maná and Juan Luis Guerra, Hispaniola, a short film for HBO, several episodes of the German series Leipzig Homicide and the telenovelas Trópico and Condesa por Amor. She has also been a presenter on Corporación Estatal de Radio y Televisión's SantoDomingo Invita, and the VIP Television, and El Fan Club programs. Taulé has been an announcer on the Punto y Seguido and Cambio y Fuera programs.

In 2011, Taulé played Katty in the original Nickelodeon Latin American series Grachi, which was very successful by then. She also had the opportunity to demonstrate her talent as a singer in a musical, Grachi:El Show en Vivo, and toured much of Latin America.

She was cast in 2013 as Camila Barrera, the youthful protagonist of Telemundo's telenovela, Pasión prohibida. It starred Mónica Spear and Jencarlos Canela, and featured performances by Rebecca Jones, Roberto Vander and Mercedes Molto.

She released her first single "Vives En Mi" and then "Mal de Amor" in 2014 with Servando & Florentino, the brothers Primera and Florentino Servando. This video has more than 10 million views on her YouTube channel and reached the top position on the Billboard Tropical Songs chart and the Venezuelan Record Report chart.

Taulé played Angie in the movie Bravetown, released in May 2015. She released another single that year, "Aqui Nadie Toca", which featured Dominican urban singer Mozart la Para. It was nominated for a Videoclip Award and already has more than 3 million views.

In 2017, Taule played a regular role of Eva in season one Star.

Taule has collaborated with Don Omar in La Fila.

She was nominated for Heat Latin Music Awards.

Filmography

Theater 
 Evita
 El violinista en el tejado
 Les Miserables
 Hairspray
 La cenicienta
 El graduado
 Baño de damas
 :es:Grachi: El show en vivo

Music 
 Aerofobia
 Quien dijo miedo con Mike Bahia
 San Pedro con Zion & Lennox
 El vecino con Lalo Ebratt
 Yo pago lo mío
 Me Siento Bien con Fuego
 La Fila con Don Omar & Maluma
 Encanto con Don Omar
 La Cadera con La melodia Perfecta & Mozart La Para
 Aquí Nadie Toca con Mozart La Para
 Mal De Amor con Servando & Florentino
 Toy Enamorao con Nacho y Mozart La Para

References

External links 
 
 Sharlene Taule en Twitter
 Sharlene Taule en Facebook

American people of Dominican Republic descent
Dominican Republic film actresses
21st-century Dominican Republic women singers
1991 births
Living people